The comb goby (Paratrypauchen microcephalus) is a species of goby native to marine and brackish waters of the Indian Ocean and the western Pacific Ocean.  This species occurs mostly on muddy substrates near mangrove forests.  This species grows to a length of  TL.  This species is of minor importance to local commercial fisheries and can also be found in the aquarium trade.  This species is the only known member of its genus. Paratrypauchen microcephalus has been recorded from areas which have soft, muddy bottoms, in estuaries and around the mouths of rivers near mangroves where they inhabit deep burrows in the mud. It is not known if they excavate the burrows themselves. This species feeds on benthic invertebrates such as crustaceans.

References

External links
 Paratrypauchen microcephalus @fishesofaustralia.net.au

comb goby
Marine fauna of East Africa
Fish of East Asia
Marine fish of Southeast Asia
Marine fish of Northern Australia
Monotypic fish genera
comb goby